Prince of Wales Island may refer to:
 Australia
 Prince of Wales Island (Queensland) one of the Torres Strait Islands in Queensland, Australia
Canada
 Prince of Wales Island, Nunavut, Arctic Archipelago
 Prince of Wales Island, Lake Nipigon, Ontario
Malaysia
 Penang Island, Malaysia, formerly Prince of Wales Island
USA
 Prince of Wales Island (Alaska), USA
 Prince of Wales Island, Jamaica Bay, New York

See also
 Wales Island (disambiguation)